The Gimli High School is located in the town of Gimli, in Manitoba, Canada.

Knife incident
In April 2012, a male student pulled a knife during a fight at the school. No one was injured, but the student was expelled.

References

Gimli, Manitoba
High schools in Manitoba
Educational institutions in Canada with year of establishment missing
Buildings and structures in Gimli, Manitoba